Pandesma anysa is a moth of the family Erebidae. It is native to south-eastern Asia, including India and subtropical Africa. It is an introduced species in Hawaii.

The larvae feed on the leaves of Pithecellobium dulce, Acacia and Prosopis. The pupae are encased in frass and earthen cells.

References

External links
 Africanmoths: picture of Pandesma anysa
  picture of Pandesma anysa on Flickr
 Proceedings of the Hawaiian Entomological Society

Pandesmini
Moths described in 1852
Moths of Africa
Moths of Asia
Taxa named by Achille Guenée